These are the Australian Country number-one albums of 2007, per the ARIA Charts.

See also
2007 in music
List of number-one albums of 2007 (Australia)

References

2007
Australia country albums
Count